is a city located in southern Kyoto Prefecture, Japan. It is the southernmost city in the prefecture and it is named after the Kizu River, a tributary of the Yodo River, which runs through the city. Kizugawa City is a part of the Kansai Science City project and houses research facilities of several corporations, including Rohto Pharmaceutical and Omron.  the city has an estimated population of 79,171.

Kizugawa City is one of the few municipalities in Japan with a growing population. In a population estimate released by the Japan Policy Council, Kizugawa City is the only municipality in Kyoto Prefecture predicted to have a positive population growth rate by 2040.

History
The modern city was established on March 12, 2007, from the merger of the towns of Kamo, Kizu and Yamashiro (all from Sōraku District).

In the Nara period, Emperor Shōmu moved the capital from Heijō-kyō to Kuni-kyō, which was located on Kizugawa City's ground. Kuni-kyō served as the capital for 5 years from 740 to 744. Its ruins can be found in Kamo area.
Now, Kizugawa City is a part of the national Kansai Science City project.

Geography

Kizugawa City is located on the southern border of Kyoto Prefecture. The Kizu River, from which the city inherits its name, runs through the city.

Demographics
Per Japanese census data, the population of Kizugawa has grown in recent decades.

Business

Kansai Science City and Enterprises
Being a part of the Kansai Science City project, Kizugawa City houses over 20 enterprises and research facilities including:
Rohto Pharmaceutical (ロート製薬)
Omron (オムロン)
Sekisui House (積水ハウス)
Fukujyuen (福寿園)
Ataka Daiki Engineering (アタカ大機)
Tatsuta Electric Wire Cable Co. (タツタ電線)
M-system (エム・システム)
Manyo Tools (マンヨーツール)
Mizuho Co. (株式会社ミズホ)
Solno Leaves Co. (ソルノリーブス)
Kyoto Press Industrial Co. (京都プレス工業)

Also, Doshisha University Gakkentoshi Campus(学研都市キャンパス), which focuses on graduate studies in biomedicine, and Doshisha International School, Kyoto (DISK) are also located in Kizugawa City.

Other public and private research organizations in Kizugawa City include: 
 International Institute for Advanced Studies (IIAS, 国際高等研究所)
 Research Institute of Innovative Technology for the Earth (RITE, 地球環境産業技術研究機構)
 Japan Atomic Energy Agency Kansai Photochemistry Research Center (日本原子力研究開発機構 関西光化学研究所)

Transportation
Kizugawa City serves as a commuter town for Osaka City, Kyoto City, and Nara City.  Osaka City and Kyoto City are both within an hour by car or train, and Nara City is reachable in 15 minutes.  Kizugawa city currently have JR and Kintetsu railways running through the city and a growing community bus system.

Rail
Kizugawa City is a key stop in railway system in Kansai. The JR Nara Line, Gakkentoshi Line, and Kansai Main Line converge at Kizu Station. Also in the west part of the city runs Kintetsu Kyoto Line.

Bus
Kizugawa City Community Bus (木津川市コミュニティバス) and Nara Kotsu Bus (奈良交通バス) run in Kizugawa City.

All Kizugawa City Community Bus buses, excluding Tono Line (当尾線), have a fixed fare. Kizugawa City Community Bus 1-Day Tickets are available at the city hall, branch offices, and on Kizugawa City Community Buses. They are useful for residents and visitors for traveling to several locations in the city.

Tourism
Kizugawa City is the home of several famous temples including:
Jōruri-ji: Main Hall, main Buddha image, and 3-story pagoda listed as National Treasures
Kaijyusen-ji: 5-story pagoda listed as a National Treasure
Gansen-ji: 3-story pagoda listed as an Important Cultural Property
Kaniman-ji: main Buddha image listed as a National Treasure

Other attractions include:
Kuni-kyō Ruins
The Kids' Science Museum of Photons
Yamashiro Local History Museum
Tono Stone Buddha Path()

Education

Postsecondary
Doshisha University, Gakkentoshi Campus

High schools
Nanyō High School
Kizu High School

Junior high schools
Kizu Junior High School
Kizu Daini Junior High School
Kizu Minami Junior High School
Izumigawa Junior High School
Yamashiro Junior High School

Elementary schools
Kizu Elementary School
Saganaka Elementary School
Takanohara Elementary School
Kizugawadai Elementary School
Saganakadai Elementary School
Umemidai Elementary School
Kunimidai Elementary School
Shiroyamadai Elementary School
Kamo Elementary School
Kuni Elementary School
Minami Kamodai Elementary School
Kamikoma Elementary School
Tanakura Elementary School
Doshisha International Academy Elementary School

Friendship cities
 Kyōtango, Kyoto (since Jan 11, 2008)
 Santa Monica, California, U.S.A. (since 2017)

Notable people
Yui Yokoyama, ex-member of AKB48
Hiroyasu Tanaka, Central League baseball player

References

External links

 Kizugawa City official website
 Kizugawa City official website 
 Kizugawa City Living Guide

Cities in Kyoto Prefecture